The 2010 Badminton Asia Championships is the 29th tournament of the Badminton Asia Championships. It was held in New Delhi, India from 12 April – 18 April 2010.

Venue
Siri Fort Indoor Stadium

Medalists

Medal count

Results

Men's singles

Women's singles

Men's doubles

Women's doubles

Mixed doubles

External links
Badminton Asia Championships 2010 at tournamentsoftware.com

Badminton Asia Championships
Asian Badminton Championships
Badminton tournaments in India